Lagenidium is a genus of Oomycota. It includes the now deregistered biological control agent Lagenidium giganteum.

Certain species can cause lagenidiosis.

References

Water mould genera
Water moulds